Saurashtra is a Unicode block containing characters used up to the late 19th century as a primary script for the Saurashtra language. The Saurashtra Unicode encoding supports both traditional and modern Saurashtra orthographies.

Block

History
The following Unicode-related documents record the purpose and process of defining specific characters in the Saurashtra block:

References 

Unicode blocks